Lena Constante (June 18, 1909 – November 2005) was a Romanian artist, essayist and memoirist, known for her work in stage design and tapestry. A family friend of Communist Party politician Lucreţiu Pătrăşcanu, she was arrested by the Communist regime following the conflict between Pătrăşcanu and Gheorghe Gheorghiu-Dej. She was indicted in his trial and spent twelve years as a political prisoner.

Constante was the wife of the musicologist Harry Brauner, and the sister-in-law of the painter Victor Brauner.

Biography
Born in Bucharest, she was the daughter of an Aromanian journalist (who had immigrated from Macedonia) and his Romanian wife. The Constante family left the city during the World War I German occupation, and Lena spent much of her childhood in Iaşi, Kherson, Odessa, London and Paris.

Returning at the end of the conflict, she studied Painting at the Romanian Art Academy in Bucharest, and established friendships with leading intellectuals of her time, including Brauner, Mircea Vulcănescu, Petru Comarnescu, Henri H. Stahl, Mihail Sebastian, and Paul Sterian. During the period, she became sympathetic to left-wing politics and joined the sociological project initiated by Dimitrie Gusti, aiding in the creation of comprehensive monographs on traditional Romanian society; her visits to various villages acquainted her with traditional folk art, especially religious icons, which she later used as inspiration in her work.

Constante first exhibited her art in 1934, and had personal shows in 1935, and 1946; her last exhibit before being arrested occurred in Ankara, Turkey (1947).

After 1945, she was employed as a stage designer by the newly founded Ţăndărică Theater, where she met Elena Pătrăşcanu, Lucreţiu's wife. In early 1946, when Pătrăşcanu, who was Romania's Minister of Justice, decided to go against the will of his party and intervened in the standoff between King Michael I and the Petru Groza executive (greva regală – "the royal strike"), she mediated between him and two well-known anti-communist figures Victor Rădulescu-Pogoneanu and Grigore Niculescu-Buzeşti, in an attempt to ensure their support for a political compromise.

Together with her friend Brauner, as well as Remus Koffler, Belu Zilber, Petre Pandrea, Herant Torosian, Ionel Mocsony Stârcea, the engineer Emil Calmanovici, Alexandru Ştefănescu and others, she was implicated in Pătrăşcanu's 1954 trial, being sentenced to twelve years in prison. The person who took initiative in bringing her to trial was Securitate deputy chief Alexandru Nicolschi.

During repeated interrogations by the Securitate, Constante tried to fend off false accusations of "Titoism" and "treason", but, the victim of constant beatings and torture (much of her hair was torn from the roots), and confronted with Zilber's testimony — which implicated her —, she eventually gave in and admitted to the charges.

Throughout the rest of her life, she maintained a highly critical view of Zilber, and expressed her admiration for Pătrăşcanu, who had for long resisted pressures and had been executed in the end. As she stated in 2004,
"I did not know [Lucreţiu Pătrăşcanu] too well. It was not [because of] him that I went to jail. Neither was it [because of] Mrs. Elena [Pătrăşcanu]. His friend, Belu Zilber, made us go to jail, me and my husband. Zilber was never pleased with all the things he kept inventing in his confessions and he would concoct some stuff that aimed to please the interrogators. To please [Gheorghiu-]Dej."

For much of her time in prison, Constante was kept in virtually complete solitude, a special regime which she later attributed to her earlier refusal to confess. Repeatedly beaten and again tortured during her stay in special prisons for women, she much later confessed that she was never able to forgive the people responsible for her plight. She was freed in 1962; in 1963, she married Brauner, who had also been released. They both were rehabilitated during Nicolae Ceauşescu's campaign of reviewing Romania's history under Gheorghiu-Dej (1968).

Constante exhibited her works on two other occasions (in 1970 and 1971, both centered on tapestry and collage art).

In 1990, after the Romanian Revolution, she published her French-language autobiography L'évasion silencieuse ("The Silent Escape"), at the Éditions La Découverte in Paris. The volume, which Vladimir Tismăneanu has compared to the works of Margarete Buber-Neumann, is written as a diary, and makes use of her prolific memory, which allowed her to record an immense succession of days, years after events had passed. It won the Prize of French-Language Writers' Association, and was translated into English as The Silent Escape: Three Thousand Days in Romanian Prisons, with a preface by Gail Kligman; the Romanian version (Evadarea tăcută) received the Romanian Academy's Lucian Blaga Prize. In 1993, she also published Evadarea imposibilă. Penitenciarul politic de femei Miercurea Ciuc 1957–1961 ("The Impossible
Escape. The Political Prison for Women in Miercurea Ciuc 1957–1961").

In 1997, Constante starred as herself in Nebunia Capetelor, a film by Thomas Ciulei based on The Silent Escape; Ciulei had originally intended to cast Maia Morgenstern as Constante, but ultimately decided to pay a special tribute to the book's theme ("I wanted to force the spectator to build himself an imaginary space, as Lena Constante had done when she was in her cell").

Notes

References
  Biography at the Humanitas site
  "Evocare Lena Constante: expoziţie şi album", in Ziua, November 30, 2005
  "Un film despre Lena Constante: Nebunia capetelor, de Thomas Ciulei, la ICR" ("A Film about Lena Constante: Nebunia Capetelor, by Thomas Ciulei"), LiterNet press release
  Lavinia Betea, "Ambiţia de a intra în istorie" ("The Determination to Enter History"), in Magazin Istoric
  Ruxandra Cesereanu, "Reprezentanţii represiunii: anchetatorul rafinat, torţionarul sadic şi bufonul balcanizat" ("The Representatives of Repression: The Refined Inquirer, the Sadistic Torturer and the Balkanized Buffoon"), at Memoria.ro
 Jane Eldridge Miller, Who's Who in Contemporary Women's Writing, Routledge, London, 2001 
 Victor Frunză, Istoria stalinismului în România ("The History of Stalinism in Romania"), Humanitas, Bucharest, 1990
  Sanda Golpenţia, "Introducere la Ultima carte de Anton Golpenţia (Anchetatorii)" ("Introduction to Anton Golpenţia's Ultima carte (The Inquisitors)"), at Memoria.ro
  Ioan Lăcustă, "În Bucureşti, acum 50 de ani" ("In Bucharest, 50 Years Ago"), interview with Lena Constante, in Magazin Istoric, April 2004
  Marina Spalas, "«Au crezut că vom accepta minciunile din scenariul lui Zilber...»" ("«They Thought We Would Accept the Lies in Zilber's Scenario...»"), interview with Lena Constante at Vlachophiles.net
 Vladimir Tismăneanu,
  "Memorie şi supravieţuire" ("Memory and Survival"), in Cotidianul, December 2, 2005
 Stalinism for All Seasons: A Political History of Romanian Communism, University of California Press, Berkeley, 2003, 

1909 births
2005 deaths
20th-century Romanian painters
20th-century Romanian women artists
Romanian essayists
Romanian collage artists
Women collage artists
Romanian prisoners and detainees
Romanian scenic designers
Romanian women writers
Romanian writers in French
Tapestry artists
Romanian people of Aromanian descent
Theatre people from Bucharest
Socialist Republic of Romania rehabilitations
Romanian torture victims
Romanian women essayists
Women textile artists
20th-century essayists
20th-century memoirists
Women memoirists
Romanian memoirists